The Claremont Shale is a Miocene epoch geologic formation in the Berkeley Hills of the East Bay region of the San Francisco Bay Area, California.

It is found within the Claremont Canyon area of the Berkeley Hills in Alameda County and Contra Costa County.

The Claremont Shale formation preserves fossils dating back to the Miocene epoch of the Neogene period.

See also

 Claremont Canyon Regional Preserve
 Claremont, Oakland/Berkeley, California
 List of fossiliferous stratigraphic units in California
 Paleontology in California

References

Contra Costa County
Berkeley Hills
Geologic formations of California
Shale formations of the United States
Miocene California
Geology of Alameda County, California
Natural history of the California Coast Ranges
Miocene Series of North America